Annadurai is a 2017 Indian Tamil-language action drama film written and directed by G. Srinivasan. The film stars Vijay Antony in a dual role along with Diana Champika, Mahima, and Jewel Mary, while Radha Ravi and Kaali Venkat play supporting roles. Vijay Antony also composed music for the film and also served as the film editor for the first time in his career. Produced by Fatima Vijay Antony and Raadhika, the film began production during February 2017 and was released on 30 November 2017.

Plot
Annadurai becomes a drunkard following his lover Esther's death. He earns the wrath of his family except for his mother. On the other hand, his lookalike brother Thambidurai is a good-natured person who works as a PT master in a school. Thambidurai and his cousin Revathi  fall in love, and their wedding is planned. One day, Annadurai is fully drunk and enters into a quarrel with the person in charge of the bar and accidentally kills him. Annadurai is arrested and sentenced to seven years imprisonment.

Thambidurai loses his job due to Annadurai's bad image in the town. Also, a ruthless moneylender cheats Thambidurai's father and takes away their textile showroom. Angered Thambidurai attacks the money lender. Thambidurai thinks that being truthful is not respected in the society and joins hands with a corrupt counsellor named Karuppiah and works as his henchman. Karuppiah is the benami for MLA Mahalingam. Thambidurai transforms into a powerful don in the town.

Annadurai gets released from jail post completing his seven years term and gets shocked seeing Thambidurai as a don. Annadurai is not accepted by his parents, as well. Annadurai threatens the moneylender to give back their property which was taken over by false means. The money lender fears and agrees. Annadurai gets back the property document and transfers his share to the daughter of the bar in charge (who was killed by Annadurai).

Trouble erupts between Thambidurai and Karuppiah, in which Thambidurai kills Karuppiah. Thambidurai decides to surrender to the police. However, Mahalingam plans to kill Thambidurai. He falsely accuses Thambidurai in a murder of an inspector and issues an encounter order against Thambidurai. Annadurai sets the stage to save his brother. Annadurai kills Mahalingam and kidnaps Thambidurai. Annadurai disguises himself as Thambidurai and informs about his whereabouts to the police. Policemen rush to the place and shoot Annadurai, believing him to be Thambidurai. Annadurai is killed. Thambidurai understands Annadurai's love for him and his family. Finally, Thambidurai is married to Revathi.

Cast

Production
In February 2017, Vijay Antony announced that he would act in a film titled Annadurai by newcomer G. Srinivasan for the production house of Raadhika. It was later revealed that the film had no connection to the Tamil politician C. N. Annadurai, and that the title was merely used to garner attention amongst audiences. Srinivasan revealed that Vijay Antony would portray twin brothers, Annadurai and Thambidurai, and the story would narrate events between 2010 and 2017. Apart from acting and working as a co-producer alongside his wife Fatima, Vijay Antony also accepted to compose the film's music and work as the film's editor for the first time in his career. The makers signed on three new actresses Diana Champika, Telugu actress Mahima and Malayalam actress Jewel Mary to portray leading female roles, while Kaali Venkat and Radharavi were also cast. Cinematography was done by K.Dillraj, who previously taking charge of cinematographer in Thagaraaru film.

In April 2017, Raadhika Sarathkumar's properties were put under watch for tax evasion meaning that Vijay Antony chose to prioritise his work for Kiruthiga Udhayanidhi's Kaali, which was also produced by him, and the film was briefly put on hold. He later continued to shoot for both films simultaneously. The film was completely shot in Tirukoilur in Tamil Nadu, the hometown of the director.

In September 2017, the makers brought in renowned Telugu actor Chiranjeevi to launch the title of Telugu version of the film, who revealed the title as Indrasena. Chiranjeevi agreed to promote the film owing to his close friendship with actress Raadhika.

Release
The satellite rights of the film were sold to Sun TV.

Soundtrack
The soundtrack was composed by Vijay Antony with lyrics written by Arun Bharathi. The audio was released under labels Vijay Antony Music and Divo.

Critical reception
The film received mixed reviews from critics. The Indian Express called Annadurai "gigantic misstep" in Vijay Antony's career and "seems like a massive error of judgment to have played a dual role in the tedious film that leads us to the obvious conclusion that we have known all along". Behindwoods wrote, "Overall, Annadurai has a few scenes that could entertain the audience, but as a complete package, it is a little too filmy and over the top."

In regards, Hindustan Times gave a positive review citing "Despite falling into a very familiar territory of sentiment and drama, Annadurai is a family-friendly film and the credit goes to debutant director Srinivasan, who makes it a cut above most films in this space."

References

External links

2017 films
2010s Tamil-language films
Films scored by Vijay Antony
Indian action drama films
Twins in Indian films
2017 directorial debut films
2017 action drama films